Swithred of Essex (also known as Swaefred) was King of Essex (746–758). He was the second son of Sebbi, and the grandson of King Sigeheard of Essex. Like his predecessors, he was not an independent ruler, but a dependent of the Kingdom of Mercia.

There is also reported a Swithred who may have been the archbishop Feologild, fl.832.

References

758 deaths
East Saxon monarchs
8th-century English monarchs
Year of birth unknown